Legal certainty is a principle in national and international law which holds that the law must provide those subject to it with the ability to regulate their conduct.

The legal system needs to permit those subject to the law to regulate their conduct with certainty and to protect those subject to the law from arbitrary use of state power. Legal certainty represents a requirement that decisions be made according to legal rules, i.e. be lawful. The concept of legal certainty may be strongly linked to that of individual autonomy in national jurisprudence. The degree to which the concept of legal certainty is incorporated into law varies depending on national jurisprudence. However, legal certainty frequently serves as the central principle for the development of legal methods by which law is made, interpreted and applied.

Legal certainty is an established legal concept both in the civil law legal systems and common law legal systems. In the civil law tradition, legal certainty is defined in terms of maximum predictability of officials' behaviour. In the common law tradition, legal certainty is often explained in terms of citizens' ability to organise their affairs in such a way that does not break the law. In both legal traditions, legal certainty is regarded as grounding value for the legality of legislative and administrative measures taken by public authorities.

Relationship with the rule of law 
The legal philosopher Gustav Radbruch regarded legal certainty, justice and purposiveness as the three fundamental pillars of law. Today legal certainty is internationally recognised as a central requirement for the rule of law. According to the Organisation for Economic Co-operation and Development (OECD) the concept of the rule of law "first and foremost seeks to emphasize the necessity of establishing a rule-based society in the interest of legal certainty and predictability." At the G8 Foreign Ministers' Meeting in Potsdam in 2007, the G8 committed to the rule of law as a core principle entailing adherence to the principle of legal certainty.

The principle of legal certainty, and as such the rule of law, requires that:
 laws and decisions must be made public
 laws and decisions must be definite and clear
 the decisions of courts must be regarded as binding
 the retroactivity of laws and decisions must be limited
 legitimate interests and expectations must be protected.

Europe 
Most European nations regard legal certainty as a fundamental quality of the legal system and a guiding requirement for the rule of law, although they have differing meanings of the term. The concept can be traced through English common law in that system's recognition that legal certainty requires that laws be made such that people can comply with them. It is also recognised in all European civil legal systems. 

Legal certainty is recognised as one of the general principles of European Union law and "requires that all law be sufficiently precise to allow the person – if need be, with appropriate advice – to foresee, to a degree that is reasonable in the circumstances, the consequences which a given action may entail". The concept of legal certainty is recognised by the European Court of Human Rights.

General principle of European Union law 

The concept of legal certainty has been recognised as one of the general principles of European Union law by the European Court of Justice since the 1960s. It is an important general principle of international law and public law, which predates European Union law. As a general principle in European Union law, it means that the law must be certain, in that it is clear and precise, and its legal implications foreseeable, especially when applied to financial obligations. The adoption of laws which will have legal effect in the European Union must have a proper legal basis. Legislation in member states which implements European Union law must be worded so that it is clearly understandable by those who are subject to the law.

In European Union law the general principle of legal certainty prohibits Ex post facto laws, i.e. laws should not take effect before they are published. The general principle also requires that sufficient information must be made public to enable parties to know what the law is and comply with it. For example in Opel Austria v Council the European Court of Justice held that European Council Regulation did not come into effect until it had been published. Opel had brought the action on the basis that the Regulation in question violated the principle of legal certainty, because it legally came into effect before it had been notified and the regulation published. The doctrine of legitimate expectation, which has its roots in the principles of legal certainty and good faith, is also a central element of the general principle of legal certainty in European Union law.

The legitimate expectation doctrine holds that "those who act in good faith on the basis of law as it is, or seems to be, should not be frustrated in their expectations". This means that a European Union institution, once it has induced a party to take a particular course of action, must not renege on its earlier position if doing so would cause that party to suffer loss. The European Court of Justice has considered the legitimate expectation doctrine in cases where violation of the general principle of legal certainty was alleged in numerous cases involving agricultural policy and European Council regulations, with the leading case being Mulder v Minister van Landbouw en Visserij.

The misuse of power test is another significant element of the general principle of legal certainty in European Union law. It holds that a lawful power must not be exercised for any other purpose than that for which it was conferred. According to the misuse of power test a decision by a European Union institution is only a misuse of power if "it appears, on the basis of objective, relevant and consistent evidence, to have been adopted with the exclusive or main purpose of achieving any end other than those stated." A rare instance where the European Court of Justice has held that a European Union institution has misused its powers, and therefore violated the general principle of legal uncertainty, is Giuffrida v Commission. The general principle of legal certainty is particularly stringently applied when European Union law imposes financial burdens on private parties.

United States 
In United States law the principle of legal certainty is phrased as fair warning and the void for vagueness principle.

However, in the Calder v. Bull case it was established that in the U.S. the prohibition of ex post facto laws applies only to criminal cases, not to civil law.

Further reading
Gerit Betlem, The Doctrine of Consistent Interpretation—Managing Legal Uncertainty , Oxford Journal of Legal Studies 2002.
Anthony D'Amato, Legal Uncertainty , California Law Review, 1983.
Uri Weiss, The Regressive Effect of Legal Uncertainty,  The Journal of Dispute Resolution, 2019.

Factors that impact on legal certainty

References

Legal doctrines and principles